Adamovo is a small settlement in the Municipality of Velike Lašče in Slovenia. The area is part of the traditional region of Lower Carniola and is now included in the Central Slovenia Statistical Region.

Name
The name Adamovo is derived from an oeconym, referring to an isolated farm known as Adam that the village developed from.

References

External links

Adamovo on Geopedia

Populated places in the Municipality of Velike Lašče